Charles "Charlie" Henry Glossop (birth registered second ¼ 1903 – 1978) was an English professional rugby league footballer who played in the 1920s and 1930s, and coached in the 1930s. He played at representative level for England, and at club level for Wakefield Trinity (Heritage № 298), Leeds and Batley (captain), as a forward, during the era of contested scrums, and coached at club level for Batley.

Background
Charlie Glossop's birth was registered in Wakefield district, West Riding of Yorkshire, England, and he died aged 74–75.

Playing career

International honours
Charles Glossop won a cap for England while at Wakefield Trinity in 1930 against Other Nationalities.

County Cup Final appearances
Charles Glossop played  in Wakefield Trinity's 9-8 victory over Batley in the 1924–25 Yorkshire County Cup Final during the 1924–25 season at Headingley Rugby Stadium, Leeds on Saturday 22 November 1924, and in the 3-10 defeat by Huddersfield in the 1926 Yorkshire County Cup Final during the 1926–27 season at Headingley Rugby Stadium, Leeds on Wednesday 1 December 1926, the original match on Saturday 27 November 1926 was postponed due to fog.

Club career
Charles Glossop was transferred from Leeds to Batley on 19 January 1933, he retired through injury in July 1934.

Coaching career

Club career
Charlie Glossop was the coach of Batley from November 1934 to February 1935.

Genealogical information
Glossop's marriage to Rose K. (née Smith) 10 April 1926 was registered during second ¼ 1926 in Wakefield district. They had children; Bernard Glossop (birth registered fourth ¼ 1929 in Wakefield district), who died in 1933 and Kathleen Glossop (birth registered second ¼ 1933 in Wakefield district) who died in 1967.

References

External links

1903 births
1978 deaths
Batley Bulldogs captains
Batley Bulldogs coaches
Batley Bulldogs players
England national rugby league team players
English rugby league coaches
English rugby league players
Leeds Rhinos players
Rugby league players from Wakefield
Wakefield Trinity players
Rugby league forwards